Paradoxiphis is a genus of mites in the family Leptolaelapidae.

References

Mesostigmata
Articles created by Qbugbot